Boon Lay Single Member Constituency (Traditional Chinese: 文禮單選區; Simplified Chinese: 文礼单选区) was a single member constituency in Boon Lay, Singapore that existed from 1976 to 2001.

The constituency was formed in 1976 by carving out part of Jurong Constituency. In 2001, it was abolished and absorbed into the West Coast Group Representation Constituency.

Member of Parliament

Elections

Elections in 1970s

Elections in 1980s

Elections in 1990s

References

Singaporean electoral divisions
Bukit Timah
Clementi
Jurong East
Constituencies established in 1976
Constituencies disestablished in 2001
1976 establishments in Singapore
2001 disestablishments in Singapore